Ray Blackman is an Australian former professional rugby league footballer who played in the 1990s.

Playing career
In 1991, Blackman started on the wing in the North Queensland Marlins side that defeated the Central Queensland Comets in the Grand Final of the Winfield State League, scoring a try. In 1992, he scored two tries for the Marlins, re-named the Northern Division, in their Grand Final loss to the Brisbane Capitols.

In Round 19 of the 1995 ARL season, Blackman made his first grade debut for the North Queensland Cowboys in a 22-6 loss to the South Queensland Crushers. In his first (and only) season with the Cowboys, Blackman started three games on the wing, scoring one try.

References

Living people
Australian rugby league players
Indigenous Australian rugby league players
North Queensland Cowboys players
Rugby league players from Queensland
Rugby league wingers
Year of birth missing (living people)
Place of birth missing (living people)